The Wilkinsons is a Canadian television series that debuted on CMT on January 4, 2006. The show follows the family as they move back to The Quinte Area, Ontario from Nashville, Tennessee.

Cast members include The Wilkinsons, their family, Lauren Ash, Alison Deon, Phyllis Ellis, 
Scott Watkins, Jordan McCloskey and Lee Hoverd, along with cameo appearances by the director (Ian Ross MacDonald) and his co-writer (Jennifer Kennedy).

Episodes

Season One (2006)
 Nashville (January 4, 2006)
 The Decision (January 4, 2006)
 Friends & Neighbours (January 11, 2006)
 The Visitors (January 18, 2006)
 Ulterior Designs (January 25, 2006)
 It's About Time (February 1, 2006)
 Winners and Losers (February 8, 2006)
 The Lockout (February 15, 2006)
 The Hospital (February 22, 2006)
 The Big One (February 22, 2006)

Season Two (2007)
 The Charity Picnic (March 7, 2007)
 Baby Bump (March 7, 2007)
 Gangsta Jamboree (March 14, 2007)
 The Road To Havelock (March 14, 2007)
 Groundhog In... (March 21, 2007)
 Ad Man Cometh (March 21, 2007)
 Rusty's List (March 28, 2007)
 Granddaddy Steve (March 28, 2007)
 Don't Want To Lose... (April 4, 2007)
 No Place Like Home (April 4, 2007)

References

External links
Official Site
The Wilkinsons at CMT.ca
The Wilkinsons at Internet Movie Database

Wilkinson, The
Wilkinsons, The
Wilkinsons, The
Wilkinsons, The
Wilkinsons, The